Bonnie Adair was born in El Segundo, California in 1952, and started swimming and diving at age 5. Adair set 35 National Age Group records and for 29 years had the fastest 50-meter freestyle record for an 8-year-old. Bonnie competed in 14 National Championships (her first at age 13) and 2 Olympic Trials in 1968 and 1972 (United States Olympic Trials (swimming)). She was many times a National finalist in the 100 free and 100 fly. She was a member of a 400-meter relay that established 6 American records.

Adair attended UCLA and then went on to Loyola Marymount University Law School. During law school, Bonnie was an assistant coach of the UCLA Women's Swim Team and was the head coach of the Team Santa Monica (Santa Monica College) age group team. In 1979, Adair along with Clay Evans started the Santa Monica Masters Swim Team, known today as SCAQ (Southern California Aquatics - https://sandbox.swim.net/). In 1997, Bonnie was selected as the United States Masters Coach of the Year and Western State Conference Woman's Coach of the Year.

References 

Loyola Marymount University alumni
University of California, Los Angeles alumni
American swimming coaches
UCLA Bruins swimming coaches
1952 births
Living people